DZYS (91.9 FM), broadcasting as 91.9 Easy Rock, is a radio station owned and operated by Manila Broadcasting Company through its licensee Cebu Broadcasting Company. Its studios and transmitter are located inside the Skyrise Hotel, Dominican Rd., Baguio. The station airs a simulcast of DZRH from 4:00 AM – 7:30 AM.

References

Radio stations in Baguio
Adult contemporary radio stations in the Philippines
Radio stations established in 1995
Easy Rock Network stations